A vial is a small vessel used for storage.

Vial may also refer to:

Vial (surname)
Vial of Life, medical program
Piz Vial, mountain in Switzerland
Distribuidor Vial, Mexican freeway
C.D.F.A. Arturo Fernández Vial, Chilean football club
Port Vial, a fictional location in Twenty One Pilots lore